The Patuxent River Naval Air Museum is a museum at Lexington Park, Maryland, first opened in 1978, which preserves and interprets the Naval Air Station Patuxent River history and heritage of advancing US naval aviation technology with artifacts, photographs and film, documents, and related heritage memorabilia from Patuxent River and other naval stations. The museum is dedicated to those who have employed their talents in advancing naval aviation research, development, testing, and evaluation.

History
In late 1974, a steering group was formed, which prepared the necessary incorporating papers and bylaws, and introduced legislation to the Maryland General Assembly. On 14 March 1975, the Naval Air Test and Evaluation Museum (NATEM) Association was approved and established as a non-profit, tax exempt organization in the State of Maryland.  In 1976, the Navy provided the current building and grounds in Lexington Park, Maryland, and the museum opened its doors to the public in July 1978. In 1978, the Museum was recognized by the Secretary of the Navy as one of the ten official Navy museums.

On May 28, 2016,  the museum opened a new building. In 2018, a new collections management facility was added.

Aircraft on display

 AAI RQ-2 Pioneer
 Beechcraft PD-373 Texan II N8284M
 Beechcraft T-34B Mentor 140921
 Bell TR911X
 Bell-Boeing MV-22B Osprey 164940
 Bell TH-1L Iroquois 157842
 Boeing X-32B
 Douglas NF-6A Skyray 134764
 Grumman E-2B Hawkeye 152476
 Grumman EA-6B Prowler 158033
 Grumman F9F-8B Cougar 144275
 Grumman NF-14D Tomcat 161623
 Grumman NA-6E Intruder 156997
 Grumman S-2D Tracker 149240
 Gyrodyne QH-50D DASH DS-1679
 Kaman SH-2G Seasprite 161642
 Lockheed S-3B Viking 159770
 Lockheed Martin X-35C
 LTV NA-7A Corsair II 152658
 McDonnell Douglas F-4J Phantom II 153071
 McDonnell Douglas F/A-18B Hornet 162885
 McDonnell Douglas NA-4M Skyhawk 155049
 McDonnell Douglas NF/A-18A Hornet 161353
 North American RA-5C Vigilante 156643
 North American T-39D Sabreliner 150987
 Northrop T-38A Talon 623625
 Northrop Grumman RQ-8A Fire Scout 166414
 Sikorsky SH-3A Sea King 148038
 Sikorsky NCH-53A Sea Stallion 151686

See also
List of maritime museums in the United States

References

External links 

 

United States naval aviation
Naval museums in the United States
Military and war museums in Maryland
Aerospace museums in Maryland
Museums in St. Mary's County, Maryland
Chesapeake Bay